ABG Shipyard Limited is a shipbuilding company headquartered in Mumbai, Maharashtra,India.

History
ABG Shipyard Ltd is a part of the ABG Group of companies with diversified business interests. Established in 1985, it is headquartered in Mumbai. It has shipbuilding operations in Surat and Dahej in Gujarat. Following its acquisition of Western India Shipyard Limited in October 2010, it operates a ship repair unit in Goa which is the largest ship maintenance facility in India.

ABG became one of the largest private ship building companies in India with a capacity to manufacture vessels up to 20 tonnes in weight. In January 2019, a forensic audit by E&Y revealed that ABG had defrauded a 28-member consortium of bankers to the tune of Rs 22000 crores. Following this in November 2019, State bank of India petitioned CBI to conduct an investigation. CBI asked the bank to investigate at their level to check for involvement of bank insiders which was ruled out subsequently. Post this in September 2020 SBI filed a fresh complaint seeking investigation in to the role of public servants and other persons in the fraud. In February 2022, a look out circular was issued against the ABG former Chairman Rishi Agarwal and others in the case.

Products

ABG Shipyard Ltd builds a range of commercial vessels. These include self-loading and self-discharging bulk carriers, container ships, floating cranes, split barges, anchor handling tugs, dynamic positioning ships, offshore supply vessels and diving support vessels.

ABG Shipyard Ltd was granted clearance from the Government of India to build warships and various other vessels for the Indian Navy. It was the second corporate shipyard to receive this licence after Pipavav Shipyard.

In 2004, it was awarded a contract to build pollution-control vessels for the Indian Coast Guard. In 2009, the Shipyard was selected to build 11 high-speed water jet propelled interceptors for the Coast Guard.

In June 2011, ABG Shipyard Ltd was awarded a  deal to build two cadet training ships for the Indian Navy. In July 2017, the company agreed to file for insolvency.

Bank Fraud 
Despite having reputation and success in the ship building industry, in 2012 the finances of ABG started dwindling which was later discovered by a forensic audit by E&Y initiated by SBI. During the audit it was alleged that the top management of the company was involved in diversion of funds causing criminal breach of trust with an intent to use the banks funds for personal gains possibly to tax havens. SBI stated that funds were used to pay other lenders and get letters of credit. Earlier in October 2016, Standard Chartered bank filed a criminal complaint with Economic Offences Wing in Maharashtra for cheating them of Rs 200 crore loan as they failed to repay the short-term loan they sought from the bank in April 2012.

Peers
Modest Infrastructure Ltd
Western India Shipyard
Bharati Shipyard Limited
Mazagon Dock Limited

See also
ABG Interceptor Class fast attack crafts
ABG Class Pollution Control Vessel
ABG Class Cadet Training Ship
Pamba Auxiliary Vessel

References

External links
 Official Website
 Rishi Agarwal Biography
 Dr Michiaki Takahashi Biography

Shipbuilding companies of India
Shipyards of India
Manufacturing companies based in Mumbai
Manufacturing companies established in 1985
1985 establishments in Maharashtra
Indian companies established in 1985
Companies listed on the National Stock Exchange of India
Companies listed on the Bombay Stock Exchange